Kemper Hall previously housed a complex Episcopal all girls’ boarding school in Kenosha, Wisconsin, United States. Kemper Hall began with an Italianate mansion and was expanded with various wings and buildings in Gothic Revival style. It was added to the National Register of Historic Places in 1976.

History
Kemper Hall was originally known as Durkee Mansion, the estate of early Kenosha, Wisconsin settler Charles Durkee. The mansion was built in 1861 as Durkee was completing his one term in the United States Senate. Four years later, he donated the building to St. Matthew's Episcopal Church, who aimed to convert the house into a girls' boarding school. It was renamed Kemper Hall in honor of Jackson Kemper, the first missionary bishop of the Episcopal Church of the United States.

Kemper Hall served in this role for 105 years. In 1875, the church built a cream brick chapel north of Kemper Hall, in a simple Gothic Revival style common among Anglican churches. A year later, the first graduating class held its ceremony there. A four-story dormitory was built to the south of this complex in 1894 and extended in 1901. A Gothic Revival dormitory and gymnasium was added in 1901. A boiler room was built behind the complex in 1905. The mansion was linked to the church in 1908 with the construction of the cloister music house.  Three years later, a convent was built to the north, linked to the chapel with a nun's residence.

The school was never particularly large, graduating only 1600 students in its history. They accepted women to its preparatory school regardless of religion, race, or background. Among the alumnae is Bojan Hamlin Jennings, the first woman to be awarded a doctoral degree by Harvard University. Kemper Hall announced that it was going to close in late 1974. The school accepted its last student as a mid-year transfer in early 1975 and held its last year-end ceremony at the end of spring semester, 1975. On June 7, 1976, the building complex was honored by the National Park Service with a listing on the National Register of Historic Places. After the school closed, a preservation-minded coalition raised money, bought the complex, and gave it to  Kenosha County, which operates it as Kemper Center, a recreational center. When the Third Avenue Historic District was established in 1988, Kemper Hall was listed as a contributing property.

References

School buildings on the National Register of Historic Places in Wisconsin
Buildings and structures in Kenosha, Wisconsin
Defunct schools in Wisconsin
Gothic Revival architecture in Wisconsin
Italianate architecture in Wisconsin
Historic district contributing properties in Wisconsin
National Register of Historic Places in Kenosha County, Wisconsin